Mariya Dimova (born 29 October 1974) is a Bulgarian snowboarder. She competed in the women's giant slalom event at the 1998 Winter Olympics.

References

1974 births
Living people
Bulgarian female snowboarders
Olympic snowboarders of Bulgaria
Snowboarders at the 1998 Winter Olympics
Place of birth missing (living people)